Mélissa Le Nevé (born July 8, 1989) is a French professional rock climber specialising in sport climbing and bouldering.

Early life
Le Nevé grew up in the Vosges until she was 10, and later began climbing at age 15, at a gym near Bordeaux.

Climbing career
Le Nevé focused her competition climbing career in the areas of bouldering.  Le Nevé was the French women's bouldering champion in 2010 and 2013, placed fourth in the 2011 IFSC Bouldering World Cup overall standings, and placed 2nd at individual IFSC World Cup events in Slovenia (2013), Switzerland (2016), and Japan (2016). She retired from competitive climbing in 2016, after finishing third in that year's IFSC Bouldering World Cup.

In 2015, she became the first woman to climb a set of boulders in Fontainebleau called the "Big Five", one of which – Atrésie – is rated . In December 2016, she climbed an  boulder in Fontainebleau, La Cicatrice de L'Ohm. In 2017, she climbed the  problem, Mécanique élémentaire, at Fontainebleau.

Le Nevé has also climbed some of the hardest outdoor sport climbs. In April 2020, she made the first female ascent of Wolfgang Güllich's iconic route Action Directe (XI, 9a) in Frankenjura.

Personal life
She lives in Fontainebleau.

Filmography
 Le Nevé's 2020 ascent of Action Directe:

References

External links
MELISSA LE NEVE, IFSC Database
VIDEO: What Gets Melissa Le Nevé Out Of Bed In The Morning, Rock & Ice (February 2021)

1989 births
Living people
French rock climbers
Female climbers
Sportspeople from Gironde
IFSC Climbing World Cup overall medalists
Boulder climbers